The Diocese of Dublin may refer to:
 Roman Catholic Archdiocese of Dublin, an archdiocese of the Roman Catholic Church in the eastern part of the Republic of Ireland
Diocese of Dublin and Glendalough (Church of Ireland), a diocese of the Church of Ireland in the eastern part of the Republic of Ireland

See also
 Archbishop of Dublin
 Archbishop of Dublin (Roman Catholic)
 Archbishop of Dublin (Church of Ireland)
 Primacy of Ireland